The siege of Creil (8–25 May 1441) took place during the Hundred Years War. French forces led by King Charles VII of France besieged and captured the English-held town and castle north of Paris.

Prelude
For the campaign of 1441, King Charles VII of France assembled a large army led by himself in person and accompanied by a powerful train of heavy artillery led by Jean Bureau.

Siege
The town and castle of Creil was besieged on 8 May. In two weeks the French artillery breached the walls. The garrison, led in person by its commander Sir William Peyto, sallied out on 24 May but were beaten. They surrendered the place the next day and went off to Normandy.

Citations

References

 

1440s in France
Creil
Creil
Creil
Creil
Creil
Hundred Years' War, 1415–1453